Bombardier Transportation produced a wide variety of rail transportation vehicles, including high speed trains, regional, suburban and metro trains, trams, and locomotives as well as passenger carriages.

Metro rolling stock

Bombardier's standard metro vehicles are the mid-sized fully automated and driverless INNOVIA Metro with the option for linear induction motor propulsion or a conventional rotary motor, and the high-capacity customizable MOVIA Metro, which is powered by conventional motors and can also be fully automated. In addition, Bombardier has produced many custom metro models not based on either model.

Airtrain JFK: INNOVIA ART 200 (ART Mark II)
Ankara Metro: Modified H-6
BART: 775-car "Fleet of the Future"; contract for 410 cars (Type D and E cars) awarded May 2012
Beijing Subway: INNOVIA ART 200 (ART Mark II) cars for the Airport Express line
Berlin U-Bahn: H & HK train stocks
Boston Subway: "#3 Red Line" cars (01800 series)
Bucharest Metro: MOVIA 346 for lines 1,2 and 3 
Chicago 'L': 706 new cars under construction
Detroit People Mover: INNOVIA ART 100 (ART Mark I)
Docklands Light Railway: all rolling stock
Delhi Metro: Broad-gauge MOVIA trainsets
Gold Coast G: Link: Flexity 2 featuring low floors and having dedicated spaces for wheelchairs, prams and surfboards
Hong Kong MTR: A-Stock
Helsinki Metro: M200
RapidKL: INNOVIA ART 200 (ART Mark II) cars for the Kelana Jaya Line
Montreal Metro: MR-73, MPM-10 (project leader, with Alstom providing underfloor equipment)
New Generation Rollingstock: NGR700 train series for the QueenslandRail CityTrain and AirTrain network. Runs on all lines except the Ferny Grove, Beenleigh, Rosewood, and Sunshine Coast (bound for Gympie North) lines.
New York City Subway: R62A, R110B, R142, and R179
Shanghai Metro: MOVIA 456
Singapore MRT: MOVIA C951 for the Downtown line and CR151 for the North South and East West lines
Toronto subway: T1 and TR (based on MOVIA) subway cars; S-series RT cars (Produced by UTDC).
Taipei Rapid Transit System: The extension line of Muzha Line system, which entered official operation on July 4, 2009. INNOVIA APM 256
London Underground: 2009 Stock (Victoria line), S Stock (subsurface routes)
Rotterdam Metro: Series 5300, Series 5400, Series 5500 (R Stock / RSG3), and 5600 Series (R Stock / SG3)
Vancouver Skytrain: INNOVIA ART 100, 200 and 300 (ART Mark I, Mark II and Mark III)

Monorails
 King Abdullah Financial District in Riyadh, Saudi Arabia:3.6 km INNOVIA Monorail 300 (under construction)
 Line 15 (São Paulo Metro) São Paulo, Brazil:  line INNOVIA Monorail 300

Bombardier Transportation's Transportation Group Incorporated acquired Universal Mobility Incorporated's UM III technologies in 1989. These systems are either still in use or have been retired. Several monorails were manufactured before Universal Mobility was established - the first was manufactured by a local Montreal company, the following two manufactured by UMI predecessor Constam Corporation.

Hawker Siddeley Montreal 1967

Constam Corporation 1968-1969

Universal Mobility 1969-1989

Bombardier 1989-present

Trams and light rail vehicles
Cobra
Eurotram
Flexity Family
Flexity Outlook
Flexity Outlook (Toronto streetcar)
Flexity Freedom (Toronto Eglinton Crosstown LRT and Waterloo Ion LRT)
Flexity Classic
Flexity Swift
Flexity Link (tram-train) BOCLF70
Flexity Berlin
Flexity 2
Incentro
Metropolitan Area Express (Portland, Oregon) (MAX Light Rail) Type 1 LRV in Portland, Oregon (1984-1986)
TEG-15 delivered to the Guadalajara light rail
Variotram (unit used on Helsinki tram network only; the Variotram brand has since passed under ownership of Stadler Rail)

Locomotives

ALP-46 - electric locomotive
ALP-45DP - electro-diesel locomotive
EP10 - electric locomotive
LRC diesel locomotives
HHP-8 - electric locomotive
IORE - electric locomotive
TRAXX - diesel-electric locomotive

Passenger carriages

BiLevel Coach - commuter rail
MultiLevel Coach - commuter rail
Double-deck Coach
Comet coaches - commuter rail
Horizon coaches
Shoreliner coaches - commuter rail
LRC coaches
TwinDexx Double-Deck coach
Superliner II cars

Regular-speed multiple-unit trains

Aventra - EMU, replacement for the Electrostar
AGC (Autorail à grande capacité) - Dual mode or electric MU regional train
Electrostar - EMU, (see also British Rail Classes 357, 375, 376, 377,  378, 379 and 387)
Highliner - Double deck EMU commuter trains for Metra
IC3 - EMU or DMU
CP2000 (Portuguese Railways Class 3400)
 KRL i9000 - In cooperation with INKA (Industri Kereta Api) for KRL Commuterline
M7/M7A - EMU commuter train for the Long Island Rail Road and Metro-North Railroad
MR-90 - EMU commuter train for the Réseau de transport métropolitain Deux-Montagnes line
RegioSwinger - tilting DMU
Talent - DMU or EMU regional train
Talent 2 - EMU regional train
Talent 3 - EMU regional train
Turbostar - DMU counterpart to the Electrostar, (see also British Rail Classes 168, 170, 171 and 172)
VLocity DMU trains for V/Line
SNCF Class Z 50000 "Le Francilien" - EMU commuter train for the Transilien H line
NS Sprinter Lighttrain - 4 car EMU regional rail trainset for Nederlandse Spoorwegen

High-speed trains

Acela Express (leader of a project in which Alstom is a participant)
InterCityExpress (participant in a Siemens-led project)
JetTrain (experimental)
Regina
Voyager, Super Voyager and Meridian diesel-electric multiple units
Zefiro, trainsets built for the Chinese market, which have a maximum speed of 
AVE S-102 (Talgo-350) and Alvia S-130 (Talgo 250) with Talgo.

People movers
 Guided Light Transit (GLT)
 INNOVIA APM

Bombardier also supplies propulsion units, train-control systems, bogies, and other parts, and maintains train fleets.

See also
See List of Bombardier recreational and snow vehicles for recreational and snow vehicles and products (including outboard motors) made by Bombardier or from 2003 Bombardier Recreational Products.

References

Bombardier Inc. products
Bombardier Transportation products
Bombardier